Crowther Masonic Hall or Freemasons' Hall in Kollam is a part of the Grand Lodge of India and it was a meeting place for many Masonic Lodges in the Quilon (Kollam) area. It is near Kochupilamoodu in Kollam city and has been a Masonic meeting place since 1806. The building is now considered as a historic monument of Freemasonry activities in ancient Travancore area.

History

The Crowther Masonic Hall, Quilon Kollam (formerly known as Quilon) was there in the map of Grand Lodge of Freemasons even before the constitution of Grand Lodge of India. The first Freemasons lodge was established at Calcutta in 1730 and first Irish Lodge was established at Madras in 1754. Incidentally the first Lodge in Kerala was founded in the year 1806 by the name "Travancore Union" at Quilon. It was actually the relocation of Lodge Minden (Lodge Minden no. 464) to Quilon. Crowther Masonic Hall was constructed during that time by Richard F. H. Crowther, who received Roll of Honour repeatedly in the year 1934, 1935 and 1941.

In 1822 another Lodge by name ‘Hibernia and Union’ was started and that too at Quilon. In 1941, Lodge Quilon was established, nearly 135 years after the first Lodge in Quilon was constituted. Now the Kollam Freemasons are active in Lodge Vanchinad No. 273 Kollam, which is near Anandevalleeswaram temple in the city. A Freemasons hall is there in Anandevalleeswaram. They are conducting meetings on 1st Sunday of every month

Threat of Demolition
In 2009, the district authorities had taken a decision to demolish Crowther Masonic Hall to build Kollam's court complex. Mr. Shajahan, the then district collector have directed the authorities to initiate the land inspection as a preliminary to the land transfer proposal. But later they dropped the project because of protests from the local population to demolish an ancient pride of the city.

Location
 Kollam Junction railway station - 700 m
 Kollam KSRTC Bus Station - 1.9 km
 Andamukkam City Bus Station - 800 m
 Chinnakada - 1 km

References

Tourist attractions in Kollam
Buildings and structures in Kollam
History of Kollam
Masonic buildings